Never Gone is the fifth studio album (fourth in the US) released by American vocal group Backstreet Boys as the follow up to their fourth (third in the U.S.) studio album Black & Blue (2000), after a short hiatus. Never Gone was originally due for release in 2004, but the release date for the album was pushed to June 14, 2005, for unknown reasons.

The album differs musically from their previous albums, moving away from teen pop into pop rock for adults. Unlike previous albums, the album featured only live instruments. The album's title track mourns the loss of Kevin Richardson's father Jerald, who is also Brian Littrell's uncle. It sold over 3 million copies worldwide.

Background

The Never Gone Tour commenced soon after the album's release. On December 20, 2005, the group released the DVD Never Gone: The Videos, which included behind the scenes footage and the music videos for "Incomplete", "Just Want You to Know", and "I Still...". The DVD also includes a slideshow with the instrumental audio of "Just Want You to Know", and an interview in Germany regarding their upcoming tour.

Singles
The singles released from Never Gone were "Incomplete", "Just Want You to Know", "Crawling Back to You" and "I Still...". Following the success of the first single "Incomplete", which peaked at No. 13 and spend 20 weeks on U.S. Billboard Hot 100, the second single "Just Want You to Know" performed moderately well hitting the top ten in the UK and Spain, and reaching the top twenty in Italy, Germany and Ireland, and charting inside the top 40 in most other charts.

Critical reception

Critical response to Never Gone was generally mixed to negative, with most critics ambivalent of the change from the band's traditional pop style to a more mature adult contemporary sound. At Metacritic, which assigns a normalized rating out of 100 to reviews from mainstream critics, the album has received an average score of 40, based on 7 reviews.

Commercial performance
Never Gone debuted at number three on the US Billboard 200, selling 293,000 copies in its first week of release. This is the band's fifth consecutive top ten album on the chart, following The Hits – Chapter One in 2001. On July 14, 2005, the album was certified platinum by the Recording Industry Association of America (RIAA) for selling over a million copies in the United States, becoming their second platinum-selling album in the country.

In Japan, it was the second biggest Western album in 2005 and had sold more than 750,000 copies by January 2006. And certificated Gold and Platinum record at 11 different countries.

The album sold over 3 million copies worldwide.

Track listing

Notes
 signifies a co-producer
 signifies an additional producer

Personnel
Credits adapted from album’s liner notes.

Backstreet Boys
 Nick Carter
 Howie Dorough
 Brian Littrell
 AJ McLean
 Kevin Richardson

Additional personnel

 Alex Acuña – additional percussion (track 9)
 Keith Armstrong – mixing assistant (track 4)
 Backstreet Boys – vocal arrangements (tracks 6, 13)
 Rasmus Bahncke – co-producer, keyboards, programming, and arrangements (track 6)
 Tommy Barbarella – keyboards and string arrangements (tracks 3, 7)
 Jerry Barnes – bass (track 4)
 Matt Beckley – assistant engineer (track 3), mixing assistant (track 7)
 Michael Bland – drums (tracks 3, 7)
 Paul Boutin – engineer and editing (track 14)
 Lee Bridges – assistant engineer (track 1)
 Johan Brorson – producer, engineer, guitar, and bass (track 11)
 Adam Brown – string engineer (track 8)
 Paul Buckmaster – string arrangements (track 4)
 Grecco Buratto – guitar (track 9)
 Paul Bushnell – bass (tracks 9, 10)
 Teddy Campbell – drums (track 14)
 Dan Chase – Pro Tools technician (track 2)
 Ken Chastain – percussion and effects (tracks 3, 7)
 Vinnie Colaiuta – drums (tracks 9, 10)
 Tom Coyne – mastering
 John Silas Cranfield – engineer (track 6)
 Dave Dilbeck – engineer (track 1)
 Aaron Fessel – assistant engineer (track 1)
 John Fields – producer, engineer, piano, bass, guitar, keyboards, and effects (tracks 3, 7); mixing (track 3)
 Jon Gass – mixing (track 14)
 Serban Ghenea – mixing (track 2)
 Lukasz "Dr. Luke" Gottwald – producer and engineer (tracks 2, 8), instruments (track 2), guitar and bass (track 8)
 Isobel Griffiths – string contractor (track 12)
 Chris Haggerty – digital editing (tracks 1, 8, 9)
 John Hanes –  additional Pro Tools engineering (track 2)
 Dabling "Hobby Boy" Harward – engineer and editing (track 14)
 Brandon Heath – acoustic guitar (track 1)
 Femio Hernandez – mixing assistant (track 7)
 Michael Ilbert – guitar engineer, bass engineer, drum engineer, and Pro Tools editing (track 8); mixing (track 11)
 Lana Israel – production coordinator (tracks 6, 13)
 Corky James – guitar (track 14)
 Mark Kiczula – assistant engineer (track 3), mixing assistant (track 7)
 Mark Kibble – producer (track 15)
 The London Session Orchestra – strings (track 8)
 Chris Lord-Alge – mixing (tracks 1, 4, 5, 8, 9)
 Tom Lord-Alge – mixing (track 7)
 Wil Malone – string arrangement and conducting (track 8)
 Billy Mann – producer, acoustic guitar, electric guitar, arrangements, programming, and vocal arrangements (tracks 6, 13); engineer (track 13)
 Max Martin – producer and engineering (tracks 2, 5, 8), instruments (tracks 2, 5), guitar (track 8)
 Alan Mason – assistant engineer (track 2)
 Skye McCaskey – additional engineering (track 1)
 Chris McMurtry – electric guitar (track 1)
 Steven Miller – engineer (tracks 3, 7), mixing (track 3)
 Brent Milligan – bass (track 1)
 Brian Montgomery – Pro Tools technician (track 4)
 Dan Muckala – producer, engineer, acoustic piano, additional keyboards, and string arrangements (track 1)
 Jamie Muhoberac – keyboards (track 10)
 Pablo Munguia – engineer (track 4), vocal engineer (tracks 9, 12)
 Alex Nifong – electric guitar (track 1)
 Christian Nilsson – engineer (2, 11), Pro Tools technician (track 2), producer and percussion (track 11)
 John Ondrasik – executive producer (track 4)
 Shawn Pelton – drums (tracks 2, 4, 5), percussion (track 2)
 Ross Petersen – assistant Pro Tools engineer (track 4)
 Marc "Fafu" Pfafflin – programming (track 3)
 Adam Phillips – guitar (track 12)
 Randy Poole – mixing (track 15)
 Joe Porter – drums (track 1)
 Steve Price – strings engineer (track 12)
 Brian Pugh – assistant engineer (track 8)
 Ed Quesada – assistant engineer (track 14)
 Rami – producer, engineer, and instruments (track 5)
 Johan Reivén – drums (track 8)
 Kevin Richardson – piano (tracks 1, 4, 12)
 Tim Roberts – assistant Pro Tools engineer (track 2)
 Chris Rojas – engineer, acoustic guitar, electric guitar, arrangements, keyboard programming, and drum programming (track 13)
 Jeff Rothschild – engineer and mixing (track 10)
 Dave "Natural Love" Russell – engineer and editing (track 14)
 Will Sandalls – engineer (track 13)
 Brian Schueble – engineer (track 4)
 John Shanks – producer, mixing, and guitar (track 10)
 Tony Shepperd – engineer (track 15)
 F. Reid Shippen – additional engineering (track 1)
 Alex Smith – assistant engineer and mixing assistant (track 12)
 Robin Smith –  string arrangement and conducting (track 12)
 James Stone – assistant strings engineer (track 12)
 Greg Suran – guitar (tracks 3, 7)
 Shari Sutcliffe – contractor and production coordinator (track 10)
 Ren Swan – engineer and mixing (track 12)
 Kennie Takahashi – mixing assistant (track 3)
 Mark Taylor – producer, engineer, mixing, and string arrangement (track 12)
 Chris Testa – engineer (tracks 3, 7)
 David Thomas – producer (track 15)
 Michael Thompson – guitar (track 14)
 René Tromborg – co-producer, keyboards, programming, arrangements, drums, and percussion (track 6)
 The Underdogs – producers  (track 14)
 Mark Valentine – additional engineering (track 10)
 Seth Waldmann – engineer (track 2), assistant Pro Tools engineer (track 4)
 Greg Wattenberg – producer, engineer, guitar, programming, and string arrangements (track 4) 
 Paul Wiltshire – producer, engineer, and arranger (track 9)
 Frank Wolf – drum and bass engineer (track 9)
 Gavyn Wright – strings leader (tracks 8, 12)
 Ghian Wright – assistant vocal engineer (track 12), assistant engineer (track 15)
 Victoria Wu – additional production (track 9)
 Andy Zulla – mixing (tracks 6, 13)

Charts

Weekly charts

Year-end charts

Certifications

References

2005 albums
Backstreet Boys albums
Jive Records albums
Albums produced by Dr. Luke
Albums produced by Gregg Wattenberg
Albums produced by Mark Taylor (music producer)
Albums produced by Max Martin
Albums produced by the Underdogs (production team)
Albums recorded at Westlake Recording Studios